Helenium microcephalum is a North American perennial plant in the sunflower family, commonly known as smallhead sneezeweed. It is found in the southwestern and south-central United States and northern Mexico.

Leaves are narrow and elliptical. One plant can have 300 or more small spherical or egg-shaped flower heads, generally no more than 12 mm (half an inch) in diameter. There are also 7-13 red or yellow ray flowers.

Varieties
Helenium microcephalum var. microcephalum - Arizona, New Mexico, Oklahoma, Colorado, Texas, Coahuila, Nuevo León, Tamaulipas
Helenium microcephalum var. ooclinium (A. Gray) Bierner - Texas, Coahuila, Chihuahua, Nuevo León, Durango, San Luis Potosí

References

Flora of the United States
Plants described in 1836
microcephalum
Flora of Mexico